Network Applied Communication Laboratory Ltd. is an open source systems integrator located in Shimane Prefecture, Japan. It is specialized in systems consulting and the development of web sites and open source software. It is one of the employers of Yukihiro Matsumoto, who is the creator of the Ruby programming language. It is known more commonly by the acronym "NaCl".

External links 
Official website

Free software companies
Technology companies of Japan
Ruby (programming language)
Software companies of Japan
Companies based in Shimane Prefecture